The Fortingall Yew is an ancient European yew (Taxus baccata) in the churchyard of the village of Fortingall in Perthshire, Scotland. Considered one of the oldest trees in Britain, modern estimates place its age at an average of 5,000 years.

Age
Some estimates put the tree's age at between 2,000 and 3,000 years; it may also be a remnant of a post-Roman Christian site and around 1,500 years old. Others have suggested an age as great as 5,000 to 9,000 years. Forestry and Land Scotland consider it to be 5,000 years old. This makes it one of the oldest known trees in Europe. (The root system of the Norway spruce Old Tjikko in Sweden is at least 9,500 years old.) The Fortingall Yew is possibly the oldest tree in Britain.

The tree

The tree's once massive trunk ( in girth when it was first recorded in writing, in 1769) with a former head of unknown original height, is split into several separate stems, giving the impression of several smaller trees, with loss of the heartwood rings that would establish its true age. This is a result of the natural decay of the ancient heartwood, which reduced the centre of the trunk down to ground level by 1770. Other than this, the tree is still in good health, and may last for many more centuries. By 1833 it was noted that "large arms had been removed and even masses of the trunk, carried off, to make drinking-cups and other curiosities." It is protected by a low wall, erected in 1785 to preserve it, but can still be easily viewed.

Clippings from the tree have been taken to the Royal Botanic Gardens, Edinburgh, to form part of a mile-long hedge. The purpose of this "Yew Conservation Hedge Project" is to maintain the DNA of Taxus baccata from ancient specimens in the UK as, worldwide, the trees are threatened by felling and disease.

In 2019 concern was expressed by the Tree Warden for Fortingall and the coordinator of the Tayside Biodiversity Community Partnership that tourist activity on and around the tree posed a threat to its survival.

History
The area immediately surrounding Fortingall has a variety of prehistoric archaeological sites including Càrn na Marbh, a Bronze Age tumulus. Place-name and archaeological evidence hint at an Iron Age cult centre at Fortingall, which may have had this tree as its focus. The site was Christianised during the Early Middle Ages, with the yew already full grown, perhaps because it was already a sacred place. A recollection of 1804 noted that "the boys of the village" had damaged the yew "kindling their fire of Bealltuinn at its root."

Rev. James MacGregor, author of the Book of the Dean of Lismore, was a minister in the church during the 16th century.

Sex of the tree
The yew is male, however in 2015 scientists from the Royal Botanic Garden, Edinburgh reported that one small branch on the outer part of the crown had changed sex and begun to bear a small group of berries, an occurrence occasionally noted in some dioecious plant species, including yews. This is possibly as a result of environmental stress. The seeds have been preserved for study and will be used to help maintain genetic diversity in yews.

Legend
According to local legend, Pontius Pilate was born in its shade and played there as a child. Dr Paul S Philippou, honorary research fellow in history at the University of Dundee, has suggested the legend is historically inaccurate and is an embellished myth.

See also
 List of individual trees
 List of oldest trees
 List of Great British Trees

Notes

References

 Keay, J. & Keay, J. (1994) Collins Encyclopaedia of Scotland. London. HarperCollins. 
 Lindsay, John (1884) "On yews—with special reference to the Fortingall Yew". Transactions of the Edinburgh Field Naturalists' and Microscopical Club. 85.

External links

Video tour of the Fortingall Yew
Forestry and Land Scotland page
BBC news "Mapping nature's ancient monuments"
Ancient Yews

Individual yew trees
Tourist attractions in Perth and Kinross
Individual trees in Scotland
Oldest trees